Rossall hockey or RossHockey is a unique form of hockey played only at Rossall School, in Fleetwood, on the Fylde coast, Lancashire, England. The game is unique to Rossall School and is played on the beach next to the school during the Lent term only, with the pitch being marked by dragging the hockey sticks in the sand before each match.  It is a brutal beach game born of rugby but played with hockey-like sticks by girls as well as boys at the school. It dates back to the 19th century when pitches were too wet for rugby. It is one of the few school coded sports to have remained in use despite the dominance of other national codes in modern sport. The only other examples of school coded sport in the United Kingdom that remain are those of the various Fives codes; of which Rossall has its own, as well as Harrow football, Winchester College football, the Eton wall game and the Eton field game.

History

Rossall hockey was referenced in the first issue of the Rossallian in 1867, though its exact date of creation is not known. Rossall Hockey started as a derivation of Rossall Football, an adaptation of the Eton field game introduced to the school in 1857 by a school master who had been a student at Eton College.

Initially the rules of RossHockey were slightly different from those of today, with scoring occurring by a system of goals and rougeables. It is also known that there were no restrictions on the number of players in a game and there was no fixed time of play - indeed one game lasted for two days.

The official rules were drawn up in 1873 and two years later the first House RossHockey competition took place. The rules were amended again in 1900 to abolish rougeables. Emphasis has always been placed on the game being one of skill and dribbling - as well as one of brute force.

In 1997 the game was nearly abandoned after over 130 years of history when the supplier of the sticks went bankrupt. A replacement supplier was found in Eccles where they had made lacrosse sticks for many years. The new sticks are slightly less ornate than the traditional ones and also made of hickory rather than ash but the gameplay has not been affected.

Rules

Gameplay
The pitch should be drawn up as indicated in the diagram, with the numbers indicating measurements in paces. The pitch should also be 80 paces in length.
The game begins with a bully at the centre circle. A bully consists of seven players from each team lined up in opposing lines. Three players from each team stand out of the bully as flies. Four sticks from each team must be placed into the centre to trap the ball.
When the whistle is blown the match begins with each team driving forward in their lines to wrench the ball from the control of the other team.
When the ball is freed from a bully the teams must each chase after it and force it in across the goal line between the opposing team's posts.
If a player loses the ball by running ahead of it, another player from their team must take it on. The ball must always be approached from the rear by a player who wishes to take it on - if they fail to do so then they are considered offside.
Scoring occurs only when the ball is pushed over the line by a player within the "D".

Fouls
Any of the following are fouls and will result in a free hit except if they are committed in the "D" by the defending team, in which case a line-bully is observed:

References

Rossall School
School sport in the United Kingdom
Variations of hockey
Youth sport in England